Helicoverpa helenae is a species of moth of the family Noctuidae first described by David F. Hardwick in 1965. It is found in Africa, including South Africa and Saint Helena.

External links
 
Karisch, T. (June 29, 2001). "Zur Schmetterlingsfauna von St. Helena 1. Teil: Großschmetterlinge (Insecta: Lepidoptera)". Linzer Biologische Beitraege. 33 (1): 407-434. 

H
Moths of Africa